The discography of Puerto Rican reggaeton singer-songwriter Yandel as a solo artist, consists of seven studio albums (one of them in collaboration with Tainy), two EP, one live album, forty five singles as lead singer, twenty seven singles as a featured artist and eighteen music videos.

Albums

Studio albums

EPs

Live albums

Singles

As lead artist

As featured artist

Other charted and certified songs

Music videos

Album appearances
The following songs are not singles or promotional singles and have not appeared on an album by Yandel.

Online-only tracks

Notes

References 

Discographies of Puerto Rican artists